Scandium phosphide is an inorganic compound of scandium and phosphorus with the chemical formula .

Synthesis
ScP can be obtained by the reaction of scandium and phosphorus at 1000 °C.

4Sc + P4 -> 4ScP

Physical properties
This compound is calculated to be a semiconductor used in high power, high frequency applications and in laser diodes.

Chemical properties
ScP can be smelted with cobalt or nickel through electric arc to obtain ScCoP and ScNiP.

References

Phosphides
Scandium compounds
Semiconductors
Rock salt crystal structure